Nikola Beljić (Serbian Cyrillic: Никола Бељић; born 14 May 1983) is a Serbian professional footballer who plays as a winger.

Club career
Beljić came through the youth system at Red Star Belgrade. He was later sent on loans to Budućnost Banatski Dvor, Jedinstvo Ub and Smederevo. In mid-2007, Beljić signed with OFK Beograd, spending the following three seasons there. He subsequently moved abroad and joined Greek club Panserraikos. In the following years, Beljić went on to play for numerous clubs in Greece and Serbia.

International career
Beljić was capped once for Serbia, coming on as a substitute for Nemanja Tomić in a 3–0 away friendly win over Japan in April 2010.

Honours
Red Star Belgrade
 First League of Serbia and Montenegro: 2003–04
 Serbia and Montenegro Cup: 2003–04

External links
 
 
 

Serbia and Montenegro footballers
Serbian footballers
Acharnaikos F.C. players
Association football midfielders
Atromitos F.C. players
Expatriate footballers in Greece
First League of Serbia and Montenegro players
FK Budućnost Banatski Dvor players
FK Jedinstvo Ub players
FK Smederevo players
FK Voždovac players
FK Zemun players
Football League (Greece) players
OFK Beograd players
Panserraikos F.C. players
Panthrakikos F.C. players
Platanias F.C. players
Red Star Belgrade footballers
Serbia and Montenegro under-21 international footballers
Serbia international footballers
Serbian expatriate footballers
Serbian expatriate sportspeople in Greece
Serbian First League players
Serbian SuperLiga players
Footballers from Belgrade
Super League Greece players
1983 births
Living people